The 2000 Berlin Marathon was the 27th running of the annual marathon race held in Berlin, Germany, held on 10 September 2000. Kenya's Simon Biwott won the men's race in 2:07:42 hours, while the women's race was won by Japan's Kazumi Matsuo in 2:26:15.

Results

Men

Women

References 

 Results. Association of Road Racing Statisticians. Retrieved 2020-04-02.

External links 
 Official website

2000 in Berlin
Berlin Marathon
Berlin Marathon
Berlin Marathon
Berlin Marathon